Étrépigny is a commune in the Ardennes department in the Grand Est region in northern France.

History
The atheist Jean Meslier was the priest at Étrépigny from 1689 to 1729.

See also
Communes of the Ardennes department

References

Communes of Ardennes (department)
Ardennes communes articles needing translation from French Wikipedia